Matthaios "Manthos" Voulgarakis (born 14 March 1980 in Chania) is a Greek water polo player. At the 2012 Summer Olympics, he competed for the Greece men's national water polo team in the men's event.

See also
 List of World Aquatics Championships medalists in water polo

References

External links
 

Greek male water polo players
1980 births
Living people
Olympic water polo players of Greece
Water polo players at the 2012 Summer Olympics
World Aquatics Championships medalists in water polo
Water polo players from Chania